Paul Meyer (born 23 July 1922) is a Swiss rower. He competed at the 1952 Summer Olympics in Helsinki with the men's single sculls where he was eliminated in the semi-final repêchage.

References

External links
 

1922 births
Possibly living people 
Swiss male rowers
Olympic rowers of Switzerland
Rowers at the 1952 Summer Olympics
European Rowing Championships medalists